The Conservative Yeshiva is a co-educational institute for study of traditional Jewish texts in Jerusalem. The yeshiva was founded in 1995, and is under the auspices of the Jewish Theological Seminary of America. The current Roshei Yeshiva are Joel Levy and Joshua Kulp.

The Yeshiva offers Jews from outside the Orthodox world the opportunity to gain the advanced Jewish learning and communal experiences provided by attending a yeshiva. It uses a synthesis of traditional and critical methods, allowing Jewish texts and tradition to encounter social change and modern scholarship. The curriculum focuses on classical Jewish subjects, including Talmud, Tanakh, Midrash, halakha, and philosophy. Learning is conducted in the traditional yeshiva method (shiur and chavruta) with an openness to modern scholarship.

The Conservative Yeshiva's educational programs include the one-year program, advanced studies program, summer program, winter break program, and Nativ pre-college Yeshiva Track.

Notable faculty
 Dr. Joshua Kulp, Rosh Yeshiva & co-founder
 Rabbi Joel Roth Rosh Yeshiva Emeritis

See also
 United Synagogue of Conservative Judaism
 Nativ College Leadership Program in Israel
 Yeshivat Hadar

References

External links
The Conservative Yeshiva Official Site
Meet Conservative Yeshiva Students and Faculty

Conservative Judaism in Israel
Conservative yeshivas
Educational institutions established in 1995
Yeshivas in Jerusalem
1995 establishments in Israel